Ari Koponen (20 July 1959 – 28 April 2018) was a Finnish motorcycle speedway rider.

Career
In 1978, Koponen joined the Birmingham Brummies for the 1978 British League season, this was his first season in the British leagues. The following year he won a bronze medal at the 1979 Individual Speedway Junior European Championship.

He remained with Birmingham for five years, scoring over 800 points until he joined Wimbledon Dons in 1983. It was in 1983, that Koponen became the national champion of Finland after winning the Finnish Individual Speedway Championship.

In 1984, Koponen switched from Wimbledon to join the Swindon Robins where he enjoyed two successful seasons in 1984 and 1985. Also in 1985, he won a second Finnish national championship. In 1987, he won his third and final Finnish national championship.

He was also a long track rider and reached the Individual Speedway Long Track World Championship final in 1988.

See also 
 Finland national speedway team

References 

1959 births
2018 deaths
Finnish speedway riders
Birmingham Brummies riders
Swindon Robins riders
Wimbledon Dons riders
Sportspeople from Lahti